Richard Young (before 1398–1418) was a medieval Bishop of Bangor and Bishop of Rochester.

Young was elected to Bangor about 2 December 1398 and was absent from the see after 1401. He was translated to Rochester on 28 July 1404.

Young died between 17 October and 28 October 1418.

Citations

References

 

Bishops of Rochester
Bishops of Bangor
14th-century English Roman Catholic bishops
15th-century English Roman Catholic bishops
14th-century births
1418 deaths